Heinrich Gottlob "Heiner" Rau (2 April 1899 – 23 March 1961) was a German communist politician during the time of the Weimar Republic; subsequently, during the Spanish Civil War, he was a leading member of the International Brigades and after World War II a leading East German statesman.

Rau grew up in a suburb of Stuttgart, where early on he became active in socialist youth organizations. After military service in World War I, he participated in the German Revolution of 1918–19. From 1920 onward, he was a leading agricultural policy maker of the Communist Party of Germany (KPD). This ended in 1933, when Adolf Hitler came to power. Shortly afterward Rau was thrown in jail for two years. As an enemy of the Nazi regime in Germany he was imprisoned, in total, for more than half of the time of Hitler's rule. After his first imprisonment he emigrated in 1935 to the Soviet Union (USSR). From there, in 1937, he went on to Spain, where he participated in the Spanish Civil War as a leader of one of the International Brigades. In 1939, he was arrested in France, and was delivered by the Vichy regime back to Nazi Germany in 1942. After a few months in a Gestapo prison, he was transferred to the Mauthausen Concentration Camp in March 1943. While in the concentration camp he participated in conspiratorial prisoner activities, which led to a camp uprising in the final days before the end of World War II in Europe.

After the war he played an important role in the political scene of East Germany. Before the establishment of an East German state he was the chairman of the German Economic Commission, the precursor to the East German government. Subsequently, he became chairman of the National Planning Commission of East Germany and a deputy chairman of the East German Council of Ministers. He was a leading economic politician and diplomat of East Germany and led various ministries at different times. Within East Germany's ruling Socialist Unity Party of Germany (SED) he was a member of the party's CC Politburo.

Origins and early political career

Stuttgart

Early years until World War I
Rau was born in Feuerbach, now a part of Stuttgart, in the German Kingdom of Württemberg, the son of a peasant who later became a factory worker. He grew up in the adjacent city of Zuffenhausen, now also a part of Stuttgart. After finishing school in spring 1913, he started work as a press operator in a shoe factory. In November 1913 he changed his employer and moved to the Bosch factory works in Feuerbach. There he completed his training as metal presser and remained until autumn 1920, with interruptions due to war service during 1917-1918 and the subsequent German Revolution of 1918–1919.
 
From 1913 Rau also was active in the labour movement. In that year he joined the metal workers' union (Deutscher Metallarbeiterverband) and a social democratic youth group in Zuffenhausen. During the following years, which saw the beginning of World War I, Rau's youth group, whose leader he became in 1916, was significantly influenced by the left wing of the Social Democratic Party of Germany (SPD). The leftists considered the war a conflict between "imperialist powers". A few local members of a far left SPD group, among them Edwin Hoernle and Albert Schreiner, who later became well-known members of the Spartacus League (Spartakusbund), visited the youth group in Zuffenhausen and gave lectures. In 1916, Rau joined the Spartacists as well and became a co-founder of their youth organisation. In accordance with the politics of the Spartacists, in 1917 he joined the left-wing Independent Social Democratic Party of Germany (USPD) and in 1919 the Communist Party of Germany (KPD), which had been founded mainly by members of the Spartacus League.

In spring 1917, Rau, by this time an elected trade union official in his firm, participated in the attempt to organise a strike against the war. His action led to a reprimand from his employer, and may have hastened his conscription into the army in August 1917. In the army he was trained in the Zuffenhausen-garrisoned Infantry Regiment 126 and deployed to the Western Front as member of a machine gun company. In September 1918 a shell splinter penetrated his lungs. In the following weeks, he was treated in military hospitals in Weimar and in Stuttgart's neighbouring town Ludwigsburg. While in Ludwigsburg, Rau managed to get leave at short notice on 8 November 1918 and joined the in those days developing revolution in Stuttgart.

Revolution
The revolution in November 1918 led in Württemberg, like everywhere in Germany, to the end of the monarchy. King William II left Stuttgart on 9 November, shortly after a revolutionary crowd had stormed his residence, the Wilhelm Palais and flown a red flag above the building. On the very same day the demonstrators were also able to seize some of Stuttgart's barracks, where parts of the garrisons openly joined them. Rau took active part in the events in Stuttgart's streets on this and the following day.

These happenings were a first cumulation of a civil commotion, that had started a few days earlier with large strikes and demonstrations. On 4 November 1918, a first workers' council under the leadership of the 23-year-old Spartacist Fritz Rück had been established in Stuttgart. During the following days and weeks more spontaneously elected worker and soldier councils were formed, and took over a large part of Württemberg. Rau was elected leader of the military police in his home city of Zuffenhausen, a part of Stuttgart's urban area.

As early as 9 November, about 150 councillors gathered for a two-day meeting in Stuttgart. A majority of the councillors entrusted the leaders of the SPD and USPD political parties, who had been invited to the meeting, with the establishment of a provisional government in Württemberg. The Spartacist Albert Schreiner, then chairman of a soldier council, initially assumed the key position of Minister of War in this quickly established first government, which for the time being shared power with the councils. However, he resigned already a few days later, after disputes about the future course of the government. While the Spartacists considered as their ideal aim the kinds of results achieved by the previous year's October Revolution in Russia, the position of the other USPD politicians was unclear and the SPD leaders supported a parliamentary democracy and early elections in Württemberg.

During the ensuing months the communists tried repeatedly to seize power in Stuttgart and other cities in Württemberg through armed rebellion, accompanied by large-scale strikes. They seized public buildings and print offices. During one such an attempt - at the beginning of April 1919 when the Bavarian Soviet Republic was formally proclaimed in Munich - a general strike took place in the Stuttgart area. The government in Stuttgart imposed a state of emergency and 16 people died in street fights. At the time of these events, Rau used his position as chief of the military police in Zuffenhausen to shut down companies that remained operational while the strike was ongoing. However, when the strike collapsed, Rau was removed from office by the government.

Rau resumed his employment at Bosch in Feuerbach. During another general strike in several Württemberg cities, from 28 August to 4 September 1920, he led the strike committee in his firm, which resulted in his dismissal.

Influences
From 1919 until 1920 Rau was head of the local KPD group in Zuffenhausen, and chaired the KPD organisation in Stuttgart. The party leader in Württemberg at this time was Edwin Hoernle. Hoernle had visited Rau's youth group in Zuffenhausen and had become a long-standing friend; he was an influential teacher for Rau and made his voluminous library available to Rau to use.
 
The most outstanding ideological authority of the movement in Stuttgart, during the time of Rau's political involvement there, was however Clara Zetkin. She was a founding member of the Second International, about whom Friedrich Engels once had written, that he liked her very much, while emperor Wilhelm II is said to have referred to her as the "worst witch in Germany". She had been living in a Stuttgart suburb since 1891 and, since then, been gathering a circle of Württemberg Marxists around her, among them Rau's friend Hoernle, who had been editing with her the magazine Die Gleichheit. Her house, built in 1903 in Sillenbuch (now a part of Stuttgart), had become a meeting place of leading national and local left-wing and communist activists. It was also visited by international communist leaders like Vladimir Lenin, who stayed there overnight in 1907. In 1920, when Zetkin was elected to the Reichstag in Berlin, Hoernle and Rau moved to Berlin as well.

Berlin
In November 1920 Rau became a full-time party functionary and the secretary of the agricultural division of the Central Committee of the KPD in Berlin. Between 1921 and 1930 he lectured at the Land and Federal schools of the KPD, and edited a few left-wing agricultural journals.

The head of the Central Committee's Division for Agriculture initially was Edwin Hoernle, with whom Rau had come from Stuttgart. Hoernle had been elected to the Executive Committee of the Comintern (ECCI) in November 1922 and Rau succeeded him as division chief the following year. Afterwards, Rau also became a leading member of various national and international left wing farmer and peasant organisations. From 1923 onward, he was a member of the Secretariat of the International Committee of the Agricultural and Forest Workers and beginning in 1924 of the executive committee of the Reich Peasant Federation (Reichsbauernbund). In 1930 this was followed with a membership on the International Peasants' Council in Moscow and in 1931 he became an office member of the European Peasant Committee. From 1928 to 1933 he was also member of the Preußischer Landtag, the Prussian federal state parliament. There he joined the committee on agricultural affairs of the parliament and became its chairman.

Imprisonment, International Brigades, World War II
After Hitler's rise to power in January 1933 and the subsequent suppression of the KPD, Rau became a Central Committee's party instructor for southwest Germany and was active in building an underground party organisation there. On 23 May 1933 Rau was arrested and on 11 December 1934 convicted, together with Bernhard Bästlein, for "preparations to commit high treason" by the People's Court of Germany. He was sentenced to two years imprisonment. After his release from custody, he emigrated to the USSR in August 1935, via Czechoslovakia, and became a deputy chairman of the International Agrarian Institute in Moscow.

After the outbreak of the Spanish Civil War and following the formation of the International Brigades, Rau attended a school for military commanders in Ryazan (USSR),  and subsequently went to Spain. After his arrival in April 1937, he joined the XI International Brigade and participated in the civil war as political commissar, beginning in May 1937, then as chief of staff and finally commander of the brigade, until March 1938, when he was injured.
 Although the brigade achieved some temporary successes during these months, Francisco Franco's troops were already on the road to victory. Rau's brigade saw combat in the battles of Brunete, Belchite, Teruel and the Aragon Offensive, where Rau was wounded.

When Rau took charge of the XI Brigade, he might have been at odds with his predecessor, Richard Staimer, the future son-in-law of KPD leader Wilhelm Pieck.  This was the time of the Great Purge which had its echos in Spain, and it could be perilous to have powerful enemies. André Marty, the chief commissar of the International Brigades based at Albacete, was also an executor of the Great Purge in Spain. Following Rau's injury, Marty managed to imprison him under a pretext for a brief time. A report, written in Moscow in 1940, described Rau as a "political criminal", who had had contact with the Spanish anarchists and members of the Workers' Party of Marxist Unification (POUM), which was demonized as "Trotskyist". These were serious allegations in this time, when accusations of Trotskyism frequently led to a death sentence if the accused was within reach of the authorities.

It seems, however, that Rau also had influential friends. He was released from prison and expelled from Spain. He moved to France in May 1938. There, he was in charge of the emergency committee of the German and Austrian Spain fighters and member of the KPD country leadership in Paris until 1939. At the beginning of 1939 Rau crossed the border to Spain again and subsequently led, together with Ludwig Renn, the remainders of the XI Brigade. Together with other remaining international units – now combined in the "Agrupación Internacional" – they fought on Spain's northern border after the fall of Barcelona, protecting the stream of refugees escaping to France. Thus the Agrupación enabled the escape of perhaps some 470,000 civilians and soldiers.

Rau was arrested by the French authorities in September 1939 and sent to Camp Vernet, an internment centre in France, and in November 1941 to a secret prison in Castres. In June 1942, he was handed over to the Gestapo by the Vichy regime and was held until March 1943 in the Gestapo prison in the Prince Albrecht Street. Afterwards he was sent to the Mauthausen Concentration Camp, where he remained until May 1945, when he participated in a camp rebellion as one of the organisers of a secret military camp organisation.

East Germany

1945–1949

New start in Brandenburg
When the war was over, Rau went to Vienna for some weeks and helped the KPD representatives in the city gather liberated political prisoners from Germany. He left Vienna in July 1945, when he led a car convoy with 120 former Mauthausen inmates to the Soviet occupied part of Berlin.

In September 1945, the Soviets appointed Rau a member of the provisional chairmanship of the Province of Brandenburg with the title of a vice-president and responsibility for food, agriculture and forests. Rau succeeded Edwin Hoernle, who had held this position since the end of June and became chairman of the central administration for agriculture and forests in the Soviet Occupation Zone (SBZ). In his new position, Rau was a member of the commission for the execution of the land reform in the province. In spring 1946 he assumed responsibility for
economy and transport in Brandenburg. In this capacity, he was, from June 1946 onwards, chairman of the newly established sequester commission in the province. 1946 was also the year of the forced merger of eastern KPD and eastern SPD into the Socialist Unity Party of Germany (SED), resulting in Rau's membership in the SED. Important 1946 events in Brandenburg were in November  elections, which preceded an official status change from a province to a federal state in the following year. Afterwards, from 1946 until 1948, Rau was state parliament delegate and Minister for Economic Planning of Brandenburg.

German Economic Commission

In March 1948 Rau became chairman of the German Economic Commission (Deutsche Wirtschaftskommission or DWK), which during this period became the centralised administrative organisation for the Soviet Occupation Zone and the predecessor of the future East German government. The organisation existed during a time of very difficult challenges coming from different sides. A particularly momentous event during this time was the currency reform of 1948. On 20 June 1948 the western German zones introduced a new currency, leaving the eastern zone to use the old common currency. In order to avoid inflation, the DWK under Rau's leadership, was forced to follow quickly with its own reform and issued an own currency too. In doing so, the DWK also exploited the currency reform to redistribute capital by using different exchange rates for private and state-run companies. The disagreement, which of the two new currencies should be used in Berlin, triggered the Berlin Blockade by the USSR and the western airborne supply of West Berlin.

Under Rau's leadership the DWK, still under supervision of the Soviet Military Administration in Germany (German: Sowjetische Militäradministration in Deutschland or SMAD), quickly developed more and more into a partner of the SMAD with its own conceptions and intentions. This policy was also endorsed by the Soviet chief diplomat in Germany, Vladimir Semyonov, the future Chief Commissar of the USSR in Germany, who already in January 1948 correspondingly stated, that SMAD orders, (which accompanied DWK orders,) should have merely the purpose to back the authority of the German orders. One of Rau's aims during the meetings with the SMAD was, to come to agreements, which also obliged the Soviet side, including subordinate Soviet authorities, who still engaged in wild confiscations for reparation purposes. An important success in this direction was a half-year plan for the economic development in the second half of 1948, which was accepted by the SMAD in May 1948. It was followed by a likewise accepted two-year plan for 1949 and 1950.

The biggest obstacle to the plan's implementation soon proved to be the Berlin Blockade  by the USSR, which was followed by a western counter-blockade of the Soviet occupation zone. As there were long-established economic ties between the western zone and the eastern, which was highly dependent on supplies from the West, the blockade was more damaging to the East. The West Berlin SPD newspaper Sozialdemokrat reported in April 1949, how Rau clearly criticized the blockade in a meeting of SED apparatchiks and there is reason to believe that he did the same in the meetings with the SMAD. According to the paper, Rau spoke of a "bad speculation" regarding the undervaluation of the dependence on western supplies, stating that the "broadminded Soviet help" turned out as insufficient and hinting that the blockade would soon be lifted. Finally the Berlin Blockade was lifted on 12 May 1949.

The DWK's increasingly centralised administration resulted in a substantial increase in its staffing level, which grew from about 5000 employees in mid-1948 to 10,000 by the beginning of 1949. In March 1949, Rau, like the representative of a state, signed a first treaty with a foreign state, a trade agreement with Poland.

1949–1953

Establishment and difficult first years of a new state
The time of Rau's German Economic Commission ended in October 1949 with the establishment of the East German state, the German Democratic Republic (GDR). The GDR was proclaimed on 7 October 1949, at a ceremony in the former Air Ministry Building in Berlin, until then the seat of Rau's organisation. Five days later, the DWK was formally abolished on 12 October 1949. Rau thereupon became a delegate of the People's Chamber, the newly established parliament of the GDR and joined the new government.

 
Likewise in 1949, the ruling SED implemented traditional leadership structures of communist parties and Rau became a member of the newly established Central Committee of the SED and candidate member of its Politburo; in 1950 he became a full member of the Politburo as well as deputy chairman of the East German Council of Ministers.
 
Between 1949 and 1950, Rau was Minister for Planning of the GDR and in 1950–1952 chairman of the National Planning Commission. In this position, as the key figure of the economic development, Rau came into conflict with SED General Secretary Walter Ulbricht. In the face of an imminent economic collapse, Rau blamed the "Bureau Ulbricht" for the wrong policy. In response East Germany's old president Wilhelm Pieck renewed the old accusation of Trotskyism against Rau. In a later letter to Pieck of 28 November 1951, Rau protested at the manner in which the Secretariat usurped the Politburo by censoring his speech on economic affairs.

In 1952–1953, Rau led the newly established Coordination Centre for Industry and Traffic at the East German Council of Ministers. The purpose of this office was effective control of the economy in order to overcome the difficulties, which were caused by a grown  bureaucracy and unclear decision paths. Prime Minister Otto Grotewohl described this in a talk with Joseph Stalin.

After the death of Stalin in March 1953, the new collective Soviet leadership started to advocate a New Course. Moscow favored replacing East Germany's Stalinist party leader Walter Ulbricht and made inquiries about Rau as a potential candidate. In response, the leading SED party ideologist, Rudolf Herrnstadt, a candidate member of the Poliburo, with assistance from Rau drew up a concept for just such a New Course in East Germany. However, the workers' uprising, which was suppressed by the Soviet army on 17 June led to a backlash. Three weeks later, during a session of the then eight person Politburo (plus six candidate members) on 8 July 1953, Rau made a recommendation that Ulbricht be replaced, while Rau's Spanish Civil War comrade, Stasi chief Wilhelm Zaisser, who in Spain had been known as 'General Gómez', accused Ulbricht of having perverted the party. The majority was against Ulbricht. His only supporters were Hermann Matern and Erich Honecker. At that moment however there was no viable candidate who could replace Ulbricht immediately. Suggested were first Rudolf Herrnstadt and then Heinrich Rau, but both were hesitant, thus a decision was postponed. The very next day after the meeting Ulbricht went by plane to Moscow and the Soviet leadership, who in part also feared that deposing Ulbricht might be construed as a sign of weakness, now secured Ulbricht's position. Subsequently, five members and candidate members of the Politburo lost their positions.

1953–1961

Competition in the Politburo and economic reform

Unlike some other rebels in the leadership, Rau kept most of his positions. He remained a member of the Politburo and deputy chairman of the Council of Ministers. In the Politburo he continued to be responsible for the industry of the GDR. However, his position had been weakened. Bruno Leuschner, a follower of Ulbricht and Rau's successor as chairman of the National Planning Commission, now became a new candidate member of the Politburo. During the ensuing period, Leuschner, often supported by Ulbricht, gradually superseded Rau as the senior leader for the economy as a whole. The official GDR press never mentioned the dissension between Rau and Leuschner and always described their cooperation as a success story.

Concentrating on his tasks in the SED leadership and as a minister, Rau – despite occasional internal criticism – avoided giving the impression of any disagreement with Ulbricht, at least in public. In 1954, Rau received in the Order of Merit for the Fatherland (Vaterländischer Verdienstorden) in gold. Later, Ulbricht stated in a 1964 interview about the "introduction of socialism" in the GDR, that only three people were heavily involved in the economic development during that time, "namely Heinrich Rau, Bruno Leuschner and me. Others were not consulted!"

In 1953–1955 Rau led the new established Ministry for Machine Construction, which combined the responsibilities of three existing ministries. His deputy in this ministry was Erich Apel, who would, in the early 1960s, become an initiator and architect of an economic reform, which became known as the New Economic System (NES). 
This later reform was presaged by a reform in the middle of the 1950s; the economic historian Jörg Roesler considers the NES in the 1960s as a continuation of this reform. The origin of the reform in the 1950s was a scientific study, commissioned by Rau's ministry in 1953, to assess the need for greater economic efficiency in the factories. The subsequent results from this study promised enhanced economic efficiency by shifting more responsibility from the National Planning Commission to the enterprises themselves. Thenceforward, already in spring 1954, Rau advocated such a planning reform, while planning boss Bruno Leuschner quite consistently opposed it. In August 1954, Rau's ministry sent a concept for such a reform to Leuschner's State Planning Commission. Eventually this reform got under way, after Ulbricht, perhaps under the influence of his new personal economic adviser Wolfgang Berger, had approved such a policy at the end of 1954 too. Subsequently, the reform accelerated until 1956. It found however its early end in the generally aggravated political atmosphere in 1957. Unrests in other Eastern Bloc countries during the previous year 1956, in particular in Hungary, had awoken the desire for more central control again. The subsequent unsatisfying economic development, however, during the following years eventually led in the 1960s to the concept of a new planning reform, the NES.

Foreign trade and foreign policy

Between 1955 and 1961 Rau served as Minister for Foreign Trade and Inter-German Trade. The term "Inter-German Trade" meant the trade with West Germany. In this time both German states still saw German reunification as their own aim, but both envisaging different political systems. The West German position was that they, as the only freely elected government, had an exclusive mandate for the entire German people. In consequence of this, the GDR's official diplomatic relationships with other states were narrowed to the states of the Eastern Bloc. Practically no other states recognized the GDR. As a result, Rau's ministry established numerous new "trade missions" in other states, which served as a kind of surrogate for nonexistent embassies. It was a corollary, that Rau, in addition to his responsibility for the export-oriented industry, also chaired the Foreign Policy Commission of the SED Politburo (Außenpolitische Kommission beim Politbüro or APK) since 1955, in this period the actual decision-making body for foreign affairs, and visited other states in different parts of the world in this capacity. Among the visited states were, beside the core states of the Soviet Bloc, also then Eastern Bloc peripheral states, like China and Albania and leading states of the crystallizing Non-Aligned Movement like India and Yugoslavia  (after the Bandung Conference). Between 1955 and 1957 he visited, as part of a diplomatic advertisement campaign in the Arab world, various Arabic states, among them repeatedly Egypt. One of his last deals, which he closed as minister, was a trade agreement with Cuba, signed by Cuba's minister Ernesto 'Che' Guevara, on 17 December 1960 in East Berlin.

Rau, in poor health during his final years, died of a heart attack in East Berlin, in March 1961.

Aftermath and legacy
After his death, firms, schools, recreation homes, numerous streets, and a fighter squadron were named after him. The GDR issued a stamp with his picture three times.

Rau was married twice and had three sons and a daughter. Like the other members of the Politburo, he lived until 1960 in a secured area of East Berlin's district Pankow and moved in 1960 to the Waldsiedlung near Wandlitz. In Pankow he had lived in Majakowskiring no. 50. In 1963, Rau's widow Elisabeth moved to this street again.

When the prominent West German SPD politician and future President of Germany Johannes Rau visited an SPD rally in the East German city of Erfurt during the time of German reunification, he was introduced as "Prime Minister 'Heinrich Rau. Thereupon Johannes Rau ironically commented on this lapse by observing that Heinrich Rau was a "Minister of Trade, a Swabian and a communist" and he was none of the three.

See also
International Brigades order of battle
East German mark
Hallstein Doctrine
History of East Germany
Medal for Fighters Against Fascism

Notes and references

Notes

References

Bibliography

Further reading

  (Shows an American view in 1953)

External links

Pictures
  – Picture with Rau, Richard Staimer and Kurt Frank in Spain, 1937.
  – The children's home "Ernst Thälmann" near Madrid was established in 1937 by the XI International Brigade as a home for war orphans.    
  – Picture with Rau and Guevara in East Berlin.
  – Picture of Rau's wife Elisabeth with Patrice Lumumba's children in Egypt. ( Lumumba was the first Prime Minister of the Congo. His family moved into exile in Egypt after or shortly before his violent death. )

Others
 
 
 

1899 births
1961 deaths
Politicians from Stuttgart
People from the Kingdom of Württemberg
Independent Social Democratic Party politicians
Communist Party of Germany politicians
Members of the Politburo of the Central Committee of the Socialist Unity Party of Germany
Government ministers of East Germany
Members of the Provisional Volkskammer
Members of the 1st Volkskammer
Members of the 2nd Volkskammer
Members of the 3rd Volkskammer
Members of the Landtag of Brandenburg
German atheists
German Army personnel of World War I
Refugees from Nazi Germany in the Soviet Union
German people of the Spanish Civil War
International Brigades personnel
Communists in the German Resistance
Mauthausen concentration camp survivors
Recipients of the Patriotic Order of Merit in gold
Recipients of the Banner of Labor